Rigan Machado (born 2 July 1966) is an 8th degree red and White belt in Brazilian Jiu-Jitsu, earning his rank under Carlos Gracie, Jr. He is a former Pan American Champion (1996, 1997 weight and absolute) and a veteran medalist of the ADCC. Machado currently teaches out of his Beverly Hills, California academy and is instructor to several Los Angeles-based celebrity students.

Biography 
Machado was born in Rio de Janeiro, and is one of five brothers in the Machado family.  He began training at the age of five with his cousins, "The Gracie Family". In an interview, when asked about his exact relationship with the Gracies, he said: "My mother's sister married the founder of Brazilian Jiu-Jitsu, Carlos Gracie."

Machado was awarded the first black belt under Gracie Barra founder Carlos Gracie Jr. and is one of the original teachers who taught in the garage of Rorion Gracie in the early days of Brazilian Jiu Jitsu in America.
He also trained with his other cousins such Rickson Gracie, Rorion Gracie, Rillion Gracie, his uncle Carlos Gracie Sr, and his brothers. At one point in 1986, he even publicly competed against Rickson Gracie at a Jiu-Jitsu competition in one of the earliest public matches between members of the family.

He is widely regarded as one of the top competitors in Brazilian Jiu-Jitsu history. He also competed and won many tournaments in judo, sambo, and wrestling. In Sambo he was placed second at the 198 lbs division, and third at the open class of the 1993 Pan American Sambo Championships in Chula Vista; and at some point between 1990 and 1994, he was seen submitting several Judo black belts in at least one Judo competition at the West Covina Dojo.

Instructor lineage 

Kanō Jigorō → Tomita Tsunejirō → Mitsuyo "Count Koma" Maeda → Hélio Gracie → Rolls Gracie & Carlos "Carlinhos" Gracie Jr → Rigan Machado

As an instructor 
Machado currently teaches at his school, "The Academy Beverly Hills", located in Beverly Hills, California.  He is also the commissioner of Jiu Jitsu World League. Due to the location of his gym, many students of his gym are celebrities such as Ashton Kutcher, Vin Diesel, Wiz Khalifa, Bryan Callen, and Charlie Hunnam.

See also 
List of Brazilian Jiu-Jitsu practitioners

References

External links 
 
 Rigan Machado Brazilian Jiu-Jitsu Association
 BJJ Legends Magazine Video Interviews with Rigan
 BJJ Legends Magazine Interview (Portuguese)
 Machado brothers BJJ victoire Sambo Pan-American 1993 – Dailymotion

Brazilian jiu-jitsu trainers
Living people
Sportspeople from Redondo Beach, California
1966 births
Rigan
Martial arts trainers
People awarded a coral belt in Brazilian jiu-jitsu
Sportspeople from Rio de Janeiro (city)